China National Highway 314 (G314) (sometimes referred to as Gansu Provincial Highway 314) runs southwest from Urumqi, Xinjiang towards the Khunjerab Pass, which is on the northern border of the Gilgit–Baltistan territory in Pakistan-administered Kashmir. It goes southeast from Urumqi and south of Toksun it turns west and follows the north side of the Tarim Basin to Kashgar. (Its sister, China National Highway 315 follows the south side of the basin.) From Kashgar it runs south to Pakistan.

The section between Kashgar and Khunjerab Pass also serves as the Chinese part of Karakoram Highway.

Route and distance

See also 

 China National Highways
 Kulma Pass

Transport in Xinjiang
314